Choroszmanów submachine gun was a Polish submachine gun created by Grzegorz Choroszman during German occupation of Poland. 

Between autumn of 1943 and February 1944 Choroszman manufactured this weapon with his sons in his workshop. It was used by Polish partisans in the Tadeusz Kościuszko unit, which men fought in and around Podlesie.

The design was based roughly on the Soviet PPD-40. It was a simple, sturdy and capable design that was easy and inexpensive to produce. This design allowed Polish partisans to significantly increase the ferocity of raids and guerrilla strikes against the occupiers. Only 22 copies of this gun were created between 1943-1944 due to lack of resources and due to the presence of other firearms.

One SMG was stored in Warsaw museum, another one - in Museum of the Soviet Army in Moscow.

References

Literature 
 С. Плотников. Партизанские самоделки // журнал "Оружие", № 4, 2000.

7.62×25mm Tokarev submachine guns
Insurgency weapons
Science and technology in Poland
Simple blowback firearms
Submachine guns of Poland
World War II infantry weapons of Poland
World War II submachine guns